The Donetsk derby was the football match between Shakhtar and Metalurh both from Donetsk, Ukrainian city in the Donbas region, the derby was also called Donbas derby.

The first ever derby was played on 17 October 1997, Shakhtar winning 2–0. In a total of 39 matches, Shakhtar won 34, drew 3 and Metalurh won 2. The last ever derby was played on 16 May 2015, Shakhtar won 2–0 as Metalurh went bankrupt after the end of 2014–15 Ukrainian Premier League.

Statistics

Results

League

Cup

Super cup

References

External links 
 FC Shakhtar Donetsk official site
 Metalurh Donetsk official Website

Ukrainian football derbies
FC Shakhtar Donetsk
FC Metalurh Donetsk
FC Olimpik Donetsk